Victoria Falls is a waterfall in southern Africa on the Zambezi River.

Victoria Falls may also refer to:
 Victoria Falls, Zimbabwe, a town on the Zambezi River in Zimbabwe
Victoria Falls Airport, an international airport near the town
 Victoria Falls, Wester Ross, a waterfall in Scotland